Wakasa may refer to:

Wakasa Province, an old province of Japan
Wakasa, Fukui, a town in Fukui Prefecture
Wakasa, Tottori, a town in Tottori Prefecture
Wakasa Railway Wakasa Line
Wakasa Station, a railway station
Wakasa Domain, a Japanese domain of the Edo period
Wakasa (surname), a Japanese surname
JS Wakasa, a ship of the Japanese Maritime Self-Defense Force

See also
Wakasa Bay, a bay of Japan